Avisa may refer to:

Arbeider-Avisa, a daily newspaper published in Trondheim, Norway, from 1924 to 1996
Avisa Nordland, newspaper published in Bodø, Norway
Avisa Partners, a French disinformation firm
Avisa Relation oder Zeitung one of the first news-periodicals in the world, published in Augsburg, Germany in 1609
Levanger-Avisa, regional newspaper in Norway
Steinkjer-Avisa, weekly, local newspaper published in Steinkjer, Norway
Trønder-Avisa, regional newspaper in Norway